The Winepress is the first studio album from The Burial. Strike First Records released the album on August 17, 2010. The Burial worked with Nick Nativo, in the production of this album.

Critical reception

Rating the album seven out of ten at Cross Rhythms, Ian Webber writes, "No real element is lacking in this recording which is well played, professionally produced, and reveals glimpses of class, but with a little more refinement and subtle variations this good recording could have been so much better." Steve, giving the album four out of five stars for Indie Vision Music, states, "The Winepress is an excellent album that should be in any metal fan’s album collection. The raw vocals, intense brutality, and technicality are a welcome addition to an oversaturated genre." Awarding the album five stars from Mind Equals Blown, Caleb Martinez says, "The orchestration between all the instruments: diabolically brilliant ... this deviantly twisted musical masterpiece. The Burial has achieved perfection: five stars!" Josh, giving the album two and a half stars by The New Review, states, "The Burial has delivered a record mired in unoriginality and stained with a couple genre clichés, overshadowing the few glimpses of genuine talent and memorable composing. Let us pray for their success and better luck next time – let us pray."

Track listing

Credits
The Burial
 David Marshall - Vocals
 Todd Hatfield - Guitar
 Jeff Wright - Guitar
 Jake Neece - Bass
 Randy Rospopo - Drums

Production
 Nick Nativo - Producer, Engineer, Mixing, Mastering
 Eric Bukowski - Engineer
 David DelaGardelle - Artwork

References

2010 debut albums
The Burial (metal band) albums
Facedown Records albums